The Buddy Holly Story is the first posthumously released compilation album by Buddy Holly and the Crickets. The album was released on February 28, 1959 by Coral Records less than a month after Holly's death.

The album featured previously released singles by Buddy Holly on both the Brunswick label (with the Crickets) and the Coral label (as a solo artist). The album became a top twenty hit in the United States and England.

The album was certified Gold in the U.S. in 1969 by the RIAA.

Songs 
Of the twelve songs released on the original album, the songs "Maybe Baby", "That'll Be the Day", "Think It Over", and "Oh, Boy!" were credited to the Crickets, while the rest were credited to Buddy Holly. All of the songs were released as singles and the songs "Peggy Sue", "That'll Be the Day", "Early in the Morning", "Maybe Baby", "Oh, Boy!", "Rave On!", "Think It Over", and "It Doesn't Matter Anymore" all peaked in the Top 40 on the Billboard Hot 100 and the songs "Heartbeat" and "Raining In My Heart" both peaked in the lower half of the Hot 100.

Concurrent and subsequent releases 
When Coral Records released The Buddy Holly Story as a 12" 33⅓ rpm LP record, they also released the four songs "It Doesn't Matter Anymore", "Heartbeat", "Raining In My Heart", and "Early in the Morning" – which were included on the LP version – as a 7" 45 rpm EP record which was also titled as The Buddy Holly Story (catalog number EC-81182). The EP peaked at #9 on Billboard magazine's Best Selling Pop EPs chart.

In April 1960, Coral Records released a sequel to The Buddy Holly Story titled The Buddy Holly Story, Vol. 2. The album was also used as the title of the soundtrack album to the 1978 film of the same title.

Track listing

Personnel 
The following people contributed to The Buddy Holly Story:

Buddy Holly – lead vocals, guitar
Al Chernet – guitar on "Early in the Morning"
George Barnes – guitar on "Early in the Morning"
Sanford Bloch – bass on "Early in the Morning"
Ernest Hayes – piano on "Early in the Morning"
Sam "The Man" Taylor – tenor saxophone on "Early in the Morning"
Panama Francis – drums on "Early in the Morning"
Philip Krous – drums on "Early in the Morning"
The Helen Way Singers – backing vocals on "Early in the Morning"
Niki Sullivan – guitar, backing vocals
Joe B. Mauldin – bass
Jerry Allison – drums
The Picks – backing vocals
Norman Petty – producer
Vi Petty - celeste on "Everyday", piano on "Think It Over"
Al Caiola – guitar on "Rave On!"
Donald Arnone – rhythm guitar on "Rave On!"
Bob Thiele – producer on "Rave On!"
Larry Welborn – bass on "That'll Be the Day"
June Clark – backing vocals on "That'll Be the Day"
Gary Tollet – backing vocals on "That'll Be the Day"
Romano Tollet – backing vocals on "That'll Be the Day"
Tommy Allsup – lead guitar
George Alwood – bass on "Heartbeat"
The Roses – backing vocals
Dick Jacobs – producer
Ren Grevatt – liner notes

Charts 
The Buddy Holly Story reached #11 on the Billboard 200 and peaked at #2 on the UK Albums Chart.

References

External links

Buddy Holly compilation albums
1959 compilation albums
Coral Records albums
Albums produced by Bob Thiele
Albums produced by Norman Petty
Compilation albums published posthumously